

The Húsafell Stone is a legendary lifting stone weighing 186 kg (410 lb) located in a west country farming estate in Húsafell, Iceland about  north east from Reykjavík. The slightly triangular, slab shaped stone is kept at a sheep and goat pen built from natural stones by Reverend Snorri Björnsson in the early 19th century, and was made famous by the legend of his daughter Guðný Snorradóttir carrying it. The stone has been used as a test of physical strength by either simply lifting the stone, or by lifting and carrying it around the sheep and goat pen. The Stone is also known as pen slab (Kvíahellan in Icelandic), because its original purpose was to act as the gate to the sheep and goat pen, ensuring the animals remain in the pen without escaping. 

Someone who could lift the stone up to their knees (which is quite a substantial feat of strength) are called lazybones (amlóði in Icelandic), while anyone who could lift it up to their waist level would be considered half-strong (hálfsterkur in Icelandic). However, for the iconic Icelandic full-strong status (fullsterkur in Icelandic), a person should preferably lift it up to their chest and walk with it around the approximately 34 meter (112 ft) perimeter  for a full 360° revolution around the sheep and goat pen  which can only be done by someone with world class physical strength, stamina and endurance as the massive stone, not only is a challenge to be gripped itself; but once placed on your chest, also crushes your lungs, making it extra difficult to breathe.

In strongman competitions

Throughout the 80s, many strong native Icelanders including Jón Páll Sigmarsson, Hjalti Árnason and Magnús Ver Magnússon have carried the stone around the pen, but most notably by Strongman and Highland Games competitor Andrés Guðmundsson who almost went two full revolutions with it, establishing the benchmark to beat. When the event was featured at the 1992 World's Strongest Man competition, the organizers transported the original stone to the event location Þingvellir and it became a very popular and an influential event in the sport of strongman. Canada's Gregg Ernst set a record at the event by carrying the stone for 70 meters (229 ft 8 in) in the designed linear path.

In subsequent years, replicas of varying weights and sizes of the stone were made and used in strongman competitions all over the world. For the 1998 World's Strongest Man in Morocco, they used a similar replica which weighed 173 kg (381 lb). The overall champion Magnus Samuelsson won the event by carrying it 79.7 meters (261 ft 5 in) in the designed linear path. For the 2019 Arnold Strongman Classic in Columbus, Ohio, Rogue - USA created an exact replica which weighed the exact same as the original. The overall Champion Hafþór Júlíus Björnsson won it by carrying the stone 66.7 meters (218 ft 11 in) around a structure which resembled the original sheep and goat pen. At the 1997 World's Strongest Man in Nevada, four Scandinavians Magnus Samuelsson, Svend Karlsen, Jouko Ahola and Flemming Rasmussen managed to carry a 163 kg (359 lb) replica for more than 80 meters (262 ft 6 in) in the designed linear path.

The original Húsafell Stone, replicas and other variations had also been used in 1993 World Viking Challenge, 1999 Britain's Strongest Man, 2000 Atlantic Giant, 2004 Netherlands' Strongest Man, 2009 Norway's Strongest Man, 2013 Arnold Amateur Strongman World Championships, 2013 UK's Strongest Man, 2019 Strongman Champions League Norway, 2021 Magnús Ver Magnússon Classic, 2022 Rogue Invitational and in numerous other Icelandic Strongman competitions.

The World Record
 98.16 meters (322 ft 1 in) by Hafþór Júlíus Björnsson  during the 2019 Iceland's Strongest Man competition. 

Andrés Guðmundsson's near two full revolutions around the pen and Gregg Ernst's linear 70 meters (229 ft 8 in) (both with the original 186 kg (410 lb) stone) eluded many strength athletes for more than 25 years. Iceland's Hafþór Júlíus Björnsson broke both those distances by carrying the original stone for 90 meters (295 ft 4 in) in the designed linear path at the 2017 Iceland's Strongest Man competition. Hafþór extended the world record by again carrying the original stone in the designed linear path at the 2019 Iceland's Strongest Man competition where it stands to date. The record around the original pen is held by Lithuanian born Icelander Vilius Jokužys who carried the stone for 83.9 meters (275 ft 3 in) (approximately 2.4 revolutions) at the 2022 Magnús Ver Magnússon Classic competition.

In popular media
The Húsafell stone is featured among other popular Icelandic lifting stones by Icelandic Strongmen Stefán Sölvi Pétursson, Magnús Ver Magnússon and Andrés Guðmundsson in the 2018 documentary feature film 'Fullsterkur' (literally translates as 'full strength' in English) which explores the history and culture of heavy stone lifting in Iceland.

Notes:

See also
History of physical training and fitness
Lifting stone

References

External links
 FULLSTERKUR: featuring the Húsafell Stone (YouTube)
 Creation of Húsafell Stone replicas (YouTube)

Icelandic folklore
Stones
Strongmen competitions